is a junction passenger railway station in located in the city of Habikino, Osaka Prefecture, Japan, operated by the private railway operator Kintetsu Railway.

Lines
Furuichi Station is served by the Minami Osaka Line, and is located 18.3 rail kilometers from the starting point of the line at Ōsaka Abenobashi Station. It is also a terminus of the Kintetsu Nagano Line and is 12.5 kilometers from the opposing terminus at Kawachinagano Station.

Station layout
The station was consists of two ground-level island platforms connected by an elevated station building.

Platforms

Adjacent stations

|-
!colspan=5|Kintetsu

Bus services
Kintetsu Bus Co., Ltd. - Furuichi-ekimae
Platform 1
Route 64 for -ekimae via Karusato and Nonoue
Route 74 for Fujiidera-ekimae via Karusato, Nonaka, and Fujigaoka
Route 77 for Fujiidera-ekimae via Habikino City Hall and Fujigaoka
Route 84 for Osaka Prefecture University Habikino Campus via Karusato and Habikiyama Jutaku
Route 85 for Momoyamada Nichome and Gakuen-mae Gochome via Karusato and Habikiyama Jutaku
Platform 2
Route 81 for Habikigaoka-nishi Gochome via Karusato and Habikiyama Jutaku
Route 82 for Shitennoji University via Karusato and Habikiyama Jutaku

Habikino Loop Bus - Furuichi-eki-suji (along Japan National Route 170)

History
Furuichi Station opened on March 24, 1898.

Passenger statistics
In fiscal 2018, the station was used by an average of 20,937 passengers daily.

Surrounding area
Furuichi Depot
Habikino City Hall
Habikino Police Station
Konda Hachimangu
Tomb of Yamato Takeru no Mikoto
Shiratori Jinja Shrine
Kintetsu Plaza

See also
List of railway stations in Japan

References

External links

 Kintetsu: Furuichi Station 

Railway stations in Japan opened in 1898
Railway stations in Osaka Prefecture
Habikino